A list of films produced in Russia in 1993 (see 1993 in film).

1993

See also
 1993 in Russia

External links

1993
Russia
Films